Mirza Hesam (also Romanized as Mīrzā Ḩesām; also known as Mīrzā Ḩasan) is a village in Hajjilar-e Shomali Rural District, Hajjilar District, Chaypareh County, West Azerbaijan Province, Iran. At the 2006 census, its population was 132, in 29 families.

References 

Populated places in Chaypareh County